Michael John LiPetri (born July 10, 1990) is a Republican attorney and politician from New York State who served as a New York State Assemblyman from the 9th district, until his term expired at the end of 2020. Located on the South Shore of Long Island, the district includes several communities including Massapequa, Massapequa Park and South Farmingdale in Nassau County and West Babylon, Babylon village, West Islip and part of Brightwaters in Suffolk County, as well as several barrier islands in the Great South Bay.

LiPetri graduated from Albany Law School in 2015 and was employed as an Assistant Corporation Counsel for the New York City Law Department representing the city and municipal officials.  Prior to his election to the assembly, he briefly worked as an associate attorney at Rivkin Radler, LLP. His grandfather, Angelo LiPetri was a pitcher for the Phillies during the 1950s.

In 2018, LiPetri defeated incumbent Assemblywoman Christine Pellegrino in the general election 56% to 44%.

Assemblyman LiPetri was a member of the Committee on Environmental Conservation, Committee on Corporations, Authorities, and Commissions, Committee on Housing, Committee on Racing and Wagering, and the Committee on Social Services.

Career

New York State Assembly 
Following a string of attacks on New York Police using water buckets, Assemblyman LiPetri introduced a bill to make it felony to assault a police officer with water or any other liquid, such as seminal fluid. This followed concerns that these attacks could escalate to use gasoline or acid. Assemblyman LiPetri participated in a ride-along with ICE officers on Long Island. Those operations by ICE "resulted in the removal of violent gang members, drug dealers, and sex offenders from our communities", according to the Assemblyman, while the officers also let Mike play with the siren.

Assemblyman LiPetri has criticized New York's bail reform law, which eliminates cash bail for certain misdemeanors and allows people charged with nonviolent crimes to be released without bail pending a court appearance. LiPetri was one of two Assemblymen to sponsor a bill to increase penalties for sex crimes involving a minor.

LiPetri has sponsored a bill in the Assembly to ban the usage of products that contain 1,4-dioxane: a carcinogen found in tap water on Long Island. LiPetri voted in favor of the bill in the Environmental Conservation Committee. The bill was passed and signed into law. LiPetri also cosponsored and voted for a bill make it easier for public water suppliers to sue polluters for contaminating water supplies. This bill was also passed and signed into law.

LiPetri cosponsored legislation to let college students deduct college supplies—including textbooks—from their taxes. LiPetri also cosponsored the "Learning for Work" Act to establish a youth apprenticeship program and incentivize businesses to participate for occupations which do not require a college education.

During the COVID-19 pandemic in 2020, Governor Andrew Cuomo and the New York State Department of Health ordered nursing homes to accept patients who tested positive for COVID-19. As a result, over 4,500 COVID-19 patients were sent to New York nursing homes. Mike LiPetri has called for New York Health Commissioner Howard Zucker to be fired as a result of this policy, and has called for a federal investigation of this policy, alleging that it has resulted in New York's higher levels of COVID-19 cases and deaths.

2020 Congressional Race 
Following the announcement that 14-term Congressman Pete King would not be running for re-election in 2020, Assemblyman Mike LiPetri announced his intention to run for Congress in New York's 2nd Congressional District. He ran against Assemblyman Andrew Garbarino, in the Republican primary. Garbarino has criticized LiPetri for his stance on term limits for congressional representatives, which he opposed in a publication for the Dartmouth Law Journal. The district is a top target for the Democratic Congressional Campaign Committee in 2020.

References

External links 
 Official site

1990 births
21st-century American politicians
Albany Law School alumni
Living people
Republican Party members of the New York State Assembly
People from Massapequa, New York
University at Albany, SUNY alumni